Cherry production in Michigan is a major part of the agriculture industry in the state. Harvesting over 90,000 tons of cherries each year, Michigan is the nation's leading producer of tart cherries. The Montmorency cherry is the variety of tart, or sour, cherry most commonly grown in the state. A Hungarian sour cherry cultivar, Balaton, has been commercially produced in Michigan since 1998.

Michigan's cherry industry is highly vulnerable to a late spring frost, which can wipe out a season's harvest. This occurred most recently in 2012, when over 90% of the crop was lost.

The Fruit Belt (also called the Fruit Ridge) of western Michigan, and, in particular, the Grand Traverse Bay region, produce most of the state's cherries. In addition, Traverse City hosts the National Cherry Festival each July.

See also
Cherry production in the United States
Agriculture in Washington state
Michigan wine

References

Agriculture in Michigan
Cuisine of Michigan
Northern Michigan
Sour cherries
West Michigan